Nonoka Ozaki (born 23 March 2003) is a Japanese freestyle wrestler. She won the gold medal in the 62kg event at the 2022 World Wrestling Championships held in Belgrade, Serbia. She also won the gold medal in her event at the 2022 Asian Wrestling Championships held in Ulaanbaatar, Mongolia.

She won the gold medal in the girls' freestyle 57 kg event at the 2018 Summer Youth Olympics held in Buenos Aires, Argentina.

She won one of the bronze medals in the women's 62 kg event at the 2021 World Wrestling Championships in Oslo, Norway. She won the gold medal in her event at the 2022 World Junior Wrestling Championships held in Sofia, Bulgaria. She also won the gold medal in the 62kg event at the 2022 U23 World Wrestling Championships held in Pontevedra, Spain.

Achievements

References

External links 

 
 

Living people
Japanese female sport wrestlers
World Wrestling Championships medalists
Wrestlers at the 2018 Summer Youth Olympics
Youth Olympic gold medalists for Japan
Asian Wrestling Championships medalists
21st-century Japanese women
World Wrestling Champions
2003 births